Nelson Island may refer to:
Nelson Island (Alaska)
Nelson Island (Chagos Archipelago)
Nelson Island (South Shetland Islands)
Nelson Island, Trinidad and Tobago
Nelson Island (British Columbia)
Nelson's Island, an island in Abu Qir Bay, Egypt
Nelson Island (Talbot County, Maryland), an island of Maryland
Nelson Island (Montana), an island in the Missouri River

See also
Nelson Rock (Antarctica)
Nelsons Island